The Chicago Bee or Chicago Sunday Bee was a Chicago-based weekly newspaper founded by Anthony Overton, an African American, in 1925. Its readership was primarily African American and the paper was committed to covering "wholesome and authentic news", and adopted a middle-class, conservative tone. Politically, it was aligned with the Republican Party. Overton established Half-Century Magazine in 1916 and it was published until 1925.

After sharing quarters with the Hygienic Company in the 1920s, the Bee moved into the new Chicago Bee Building, an Art Deco structure built between 1929 and 1931.  However, after Overton's bank failed in the 1930s, the two businesses shared quarters once again, as the Hygienic Company moved into the Bee building.

Chandler Owen became editor of the Bee after moving to Chicago. The Bee initially supported the Brotherhood of Sleeping Car Porters, which Owen supported, but later joined other publications including the Chicago Defender in opposing the union.

Subsequent editors of the paper included Ida B. Wells and Olive Diggs. The Bees editorial staff was mostly female, and the newspaper covered the black women's club movement extensively.  It distinguished itself from other newspapers in the Chicago black press in its promotion of black history and literature.

The Bee sponsored the original "Mayor of Bronzeville" contest which led to the use of the term "Bronzeville" for the neighborhood.  The concept was originally suggested by theater editor James Gentry, who coined the term and had been sponsoring a beauty contest in the neighborhood since 1916. When Gentry left the paper in 1932, he took his concept with him to the Chicago Defender, which continued the contests.

The paper's founder and owner Anthony Overton was a wealthy industrialist, owning such concerns as the Overton Hygienic Company, a cosmetics firm. He had also made a previous venture in publishing, in the form of the Half Century Magazine. After Overton's death in 1946, the Bee was briefly continued by his sons in a tabloid format, but was unsuccessful. It ceased publication in 1947.

Very little of the Bee survives today, apart from the building it occupied. One historian was unable to find a single intact issue from the years 1925 to 1935.

References

Works cited

External links
Scans of the Chicago Bee

1925 establishments in Illinois
1947 disestablishments in Illinois
African-American history in Chicago
Defunct African-American newspapers
Defunct newspapers published in Chicago
Publications established in 1925
Publications disestablished in 1947